Royal Air Force Detling or more simply RAF Detling is a former Royal Air Force station situated  above sea level, located near Detling, a village about  miles north-east of Maidstone, Kent.

It was a station of the Royal Naval Air Service (RNAS) in the First World War and the Royal Air Force (RAF) in the Second World War. Although not a fighter base, the airfield suffered several raids by the Luftwaffe, especially during the period of the Battle of Britain.

History
The Fleet Air Arm aircraft also shared some facilities during the second World War. The airfield closed in December 1919 to military flying, and after the war it was used by the Short factory at Rochester to test aircraft, and civilian gliding also started in 1930.

RAF Detling opened in September 1938 and was assigned to No. 16 Group RAF (with headquarters in Chatham) in Coastal Command, for patrols protecting coastal shipping. Although the site was prone to fog, it was re-activated as it had an excellent view over the Medway towns. No. 500 Sqn were the first squadron to move in from RAF Manston. During the Battle of Britain, the base was subject to several raids by enemy aircraft, but also provided a useful stopover location for aircraft from No. 11 Group who could return to their home bases later. On 13 August 1940, a day the Luftwaffe codenamed Adlertag (Eagle Day), at least 50 bombers set out to bomb Detling and RAF Rochford. This resulted in several casualties at Detling, but had little effect on Fighter Command, as the base was an asset of Coastal Command. Twenty-two aircraft were destroyed on the ground, the hangars were set alight and a direct hit on the operations room killed the commanding officer. In total, 67 service and civilian personnel were killed in the raid. The base suffered several attacks during August and September 1940.

In 1943, it was transferred first to RAF Army Cooperation Command, then to Fighter Command, ahead of the D Day landings. By December 1944, all flying had ceased, and being a grassed airfield, which were surplus to requirements, Detling was placed on a care and maintenance basis from 1 January 1945. Fears of Nazi fanatics not abiding by a surrender, led to the RAF Regiment setting up a disarmament school, teaching students about booby-trapped buildings and dealing with German prisoners. RAF gliding schools use the site after the war, with the Air Training Corps gliders using the airfield alongside civilian gliding clubs. However, these all had to leave when the RAF disposed of the site back to its original owners who were not interested in running it as a gliding site, eventually closing in 1959.

The site of the airfield is now home to the annual Kent County Show, which takes place for three days every July, and a number of other shows and events.

Notable personnel
Ronald Cuthbert Hay – Served with No. 801 Squadron NAS in 1940 at the base.
Daphne Pearson – Pearson was billeted at Detling in 1940 when she was awarded a George Cross for an act of bravery in rescuing a pilot from a burning aircraft which had crashed on the airfield. Pearson had just go him to safety when the bombs on board exploded. Initially awarded the Empire Gallantry Medal, this was changed to the George Cross later.

Operational units and aircraft
First World War
 No. 50 Squadron RFC Detachment (1916) –  Vickers ES 1
 No. 112 Squadron RFC (1917) – Vickers ES 1
 No. 143 Squadron RFC/RAF (1918-1919) – Armstrong Whitworth FK.8, Royal Aircraft Factory SE.5A, Sopwith Camel & Sopwith Snipe
Inter war period and Second World War
 No. 500 Squadron RAF (1938-1939) – Hawker Hind, Avro Anson I
 No. 48 Squadron RAF Detachment (1939) – Avro Anson I – provided support to 500 Squadron
 No. 4 Squadron RAF Detachment (1940) – Westland Lysander II
 No. 53 Squadron RAF (1940) – Bristol Blenheim IV
 No. 235 Squadron RAF (1940) – Bristol Blenheim 1F
 806 Naval Air Squadron's Detachment No. 9 between 7 and 31 May 1940 with the Skua II
 825 Naval Air Squadron initially between 18 and 28 May 1940 then again between 1 and 5 July 1940 with the Swordfish I
 819 Naval Air Squadron's Detachment No. 6 between 21 and 23 May 1940 with the Swordfish I
 815 Naval Air Squadron between 27 May and 2 June 1940 with the Swordfish I
 826 Naval Air Squadron between 31 May and 1 June 1940 with the Albacore I
 801 Naval Air Squadron between 31 May and 23 June 1940 with the Skua II
 812 Naval Air Squadron's Detachment No. 7 between 27 and 28 August 1940 with the Swordfish I
 812 Naval Air Squadron's Detachment No. 2 between 27 December 1940 and 12 March 1941 with the Swordfish
 No. 13 Squadron RAF Detachment (1941) – Bristol Blenheim IV
 No. 26 Squadron RAF (1941) – Curtiss Tomahawk II
 No. 59 Squadron RAF (1941) – Bristol Blenheim IV
 816 Naval Air Squadron's Detachment No. 2 initially between 12 March and 4 April 1941 and then between 11 and 16 April 1941. 'X' Flight joined on 23 April 1941 until being redesignated as 821 NAS on 1 July 1941
 821 Naval Air Squadron between 1 July and 14 July 1941 with the Swordfish I
 No. 239 Squadron RAF (1942) – North American Mustang I
 No. 280 Squadron RAF (1942) – Avro Anson I
 No. 26 Squadron RAF (1943) – North American Mustang II
 No. 318 Squadron RAF (1943) – Hawker Hurricane I
 No. 567 Squadron RAF (1943-1944) – Fairey Barracuda, Miles Martinet, Hawker Hurricane IV & Airspeed Oxford
 No. 655 Squadron RAF (1943) – Auster III
 No. 125 Airfield RAF (October 1943 – May 1944)
 No. 132 Squadron RAF (1943) – Supermarine Spitfire IXB
 No. 184 Squadron RAF (1943) – Hawker Hurricane IV
 No. 602 Squadron RAF (1943) – Supermarine Spitfire IXB
 No. 1 Squadron RAF (1944) – Supermarine Spitfire IXB
 No. 118 Squadron RAF (1944) – Supermarine Spitfire IX
 No. 124 Squadron RAF (1944) – Supermarine Spitfire VII & HF.IXE
 No. 165 Squadron RAF (1944) – Supermarine Spitfire IXB
 No. 453 Squadron RAAF (1944) – Supermarine Spitfire IXB
 No. 504 Squadron RAF (1944) – Supermarine Spitfire IXE
 Unknown Fighter Wing
 No. 80 Squadron RAF (1944) – Supermarine Spitfire IX
 No. 229 Squadron RAF (1944) – Supermarine Spitfire IX
 No. 274 Squadron RAF (1944) – Supermarine Spitfire IX
 No. 651 Squadron RAF (No. 1903 Flight) (1951-1955) – Bristol Sycamore HC11
 No. 651 Squadron RAF (No. 1902 Flight) (1955-1957) – Auster AOP6

The following units were also here at some point:

References

Sources

External links
 RAF Detling in World War II

Royal Air Force stations in Kent
Royal Naval Air Stations in Kent
Military airbases established in 1939
Military installations closed in 1959